The City Hall of Moscow, Idaho, formerly known as the Moscow Post Office and Courthouse and Moscow Federal Building, was built  in 1911. Its red brick with ivory terracotta trim reflects Late Victorian and Eclectic  

As a federal building, it served historically as a post office and a courthouse of the U.S. District Court for the District of Idaho. Listed on the National Register of Historic Places in 1973, it was vacated in 1974 when the new federal building opened two blocks south. Two years later, it was acquired by the city from the General Services Administration for $70,000, with half of that funded from the state historical society. At the time, the land alone was valued at $100,000.

Rejected for use as a library in 1979, it became a community center in the early 1980s.

A bond issue to fund a renovation was defeated in late 1986, it became the city hall of the municipality in the 1990s.

See also 
 National Register of Historic Places listings in Latah County, Idaho
 List of United States post offices

References

External links 

Preservation Moscow: Newsletter of the Moscow Historic Preservation Commission :: May 2010
City of Moscow - City Hall / 1910 Old Post Office

Courthouses on the National Register of Historic Places in Idaho
Post office buildings on the National Register of Historic Places in Idaho
Government buildings completed in 1911
Buildings and structures in Latah County, Idaho
Victorian architecture in Idaho
Post office buildings in Idaho
Courthouses in Idaho
Moscow, Idaho
National Register of Historic Places in Latah County, Idaho
1911 establishments in Idaho